The 2020 North Carolina Courage season was the team's fourth season as a professional women's soccer team. North Carolina Courage plays in the National Women's Soccer League, the top tier of women's soccer in the United States.

Team

Coaching staff 

 Source: North Carolina Courage

First-team roster 

*
 (loaned out)

*
*
*

*

 (loaned out)
 (loaned out)

 Player opted not to participate in the 2020 NWSL Fall Series.

Player transactions

2020 NWSL College Draft 

 Source: National Women's Soccer League

Players in

Players out

Competitions

National Women's Soccer League

Preseason 

 ''Source: North Carolina Courage

On March 12, 2020, the preseason match schedule was cancelled due to the COVID-19 pandemic.

Regular season 

On May 27, 2020, the NWSL announced that the 2020 NWSL regular season and playoffs were canceled due to the pandemic, and that the 2020 NWSL Challenge Cup would mark the league's return to action.

Challenge Cup

Preliminary round

Quarter-finals

Fall Series 

The Courage competed in the South "pod" of the NWSL Fall Series tournament, with the Houston Dash and Orlando Pride.

References 

North Carolina Courage seasons
North Carolina Courage